John Duffy (born 2 July 1980) was the head coach of the Leigh Centurions in the Betfred Super League, and is a former Scotland international rugby league footballer who played as a  and  in the 1990s, 2000s and 2010s.

Duffy played for the Leigh Centurions, Salford City Reds and Warrington Wolves in the Super League, and also for Whitehaven. He was a Scotland international.

He has held the position of head coach at the Swinton Lions and Featherstone Rovers in the Betfred Championship.

Background
Duffy was born in Platt Bridge, Greater Manchester, England.

Career
Duffy became Super League's youngest débutant when he made his Warrington Wolves début at the age of 16.

He was named in the Scotland squad for the 2008 Rugby League World Cup, and was part of the coaching staff for their 2013 Rugby League World Cup campaign.

In June 2014, he was appointed head coach of Swinton Lions in the wake of Lions' player coach Ian Watson's departure to become Salford's assistant coach.

On 17 July 2017, Duffy resigned from Swinton after what had been a traumatic season for all concerned in the club. He immediately took up a new post with Featherstone Rovers after their coach Jon Sharp left the club.

On 2 June 2021, it was announced that Duffy had parted with Leigh Centurions as head coach, by mutual consent after Leigh started the 2021 Super League season with eight straight defeats.

References

External links
Scotland Rugby League International Honours Board
Whitehaven rule out player sale

1980 births
Living people
Chorley Lynx players
English rugby league coaches
English rugby league players
Featherstone Rovers coaches
Leigh Leopards captains
Leigh Leopards coaches
Leigh Leopards players
Rugby league five-eighths
Rugby league halfbacks
Rugby league hookers
Rugby league players from Wigan
Salford Red Devils players
Scotland national rugby league team coaches
Scotland national rugby league team players
Swinton Lions coaches
Warrington Wolves players
Whitehaven R.L.F.C. players
Widnes Vikings players